Jidanul River may refer to:

 Jidanul River (Bicaz)
 Jidanu, a tributary of the Jiul de Vest in Gorj County